Don Juan Carey III (born February 14, 1987) is a former American football safety. He was drafted by the Cleveland Browns in the sixth round of the 2009 NFL Draft. He played college football at Norfolk State. He has also been a member of the Jacksonville Jaguars.

Carey was later elected to the Chesapeake, Virginia city council.

Early years
Prior to attending Norfolk State, Carey went to Booker T. Washington High School in Norfolk, Virginia.

Don's younger brother Donte played defensive back for Grand Valley State, a Division II school in Allendale, Michigan.

Personal life
Carey announced he would retire from the NFL and would move to Chesapeake, Virginia on April 27, 2019, where he lives with his wife, Lakeisha, an attorney, and their three children.  During Carey's stint in the NFL, he and his wife established the REECH Foundation -- Reaching, Educating and Empowering Our Children -- and now operate it out of the Tidewater region of Virginia, where they reside.  The Foundation is focused on "STEM [Education] (Science, Technology, Engineering, & Math), physical wellbeing, health, social and moral responsibility along with vocational and collegiate preparation."

Professional career

Cleveland Browns
The Cleveland Browns selected Carey in the sixth round (177th overall) of the 2009 NFL Draft. He was the 24th cornerback drafted in 2009.

On July 14, 2009, the Cleveland Browns signed Carey to a four-year, $1.86 million contract that includes a signing bonus of $116,750.

Throughout training camp, he competed for a roster spot as a backup cornerback against Hank Poteat, Corey Ivy, Gerard Lawson, and Coye Francies. On August 6, 2009, the Cleveland Browns waived Carey due to a shoulder injury.

Jacksonville Jaguars
On August 7, 2009, the Jacksonville Jaguars claimed Carey off of waivers. The Jacksonville Jaguars were criticized for claiming Carey as it was expected the Browns would've placed him on injured reserve after clearing waivers. On September 1, 2009, the Jaguars placed him on injured reserve due to his shoulder injury that kept him sidelined for the remainder of the season.

2010
During training camp, he competed for a roster spot as a backup cornerback against Tyron Brackenridge, William Middleton, Scotty McGee, Josh Gordy, and Chris Hawkins.

2011
Carey was waived by the Jaguars prior to the start of the 2011 season.

Detroit Lions
The Detroit Lions signed Carey on October 25, 2011. He saw action in nine games (six starts), providing an immediate impact on defense and special teams, totaling 12 special teams tackles (10 solo) to go along with his 27 tackles (19 solo) on defense. 

In 2013, Carey was a versatile option at nickel and a source of stability to the Lions secondary and special teams coverage unit. Totaled 19 tackles (16 solo), two pass defenses and finished second on the team in special teams tackles with 11 (eight solo). He had a breakout performance at Pittsburgh on November 17 where he started at linebacker and had a career-high nine tackles.

In 2014, Carey missed only three games due to a hamstring injury, and started three of his 13 games. He finished the season with seven tackles (six solo), one fumble recovery and five special teams tackles. On January 10, 2014, Carey signed a three-year contract extension with the Lions. 

In 2015, Carey led the NFL in solo special teams tackles with 14, and tied for second in total special teams tackles with 16. He recorded a special teams tackle in 11 of the 16 games during the season.

And in 2016, Carey was nominated as the Lions's Walter Payton Man of the Year, including for his contribution to "Athletes for Charity [working] to install a youth literacy program at two Detroit area schools, with a focus on STEM — a curriculum centered around science, technology, engineering and mathematics."

Carey signed a one-year contract extension with the Lions through 2017 on November 16, 2016.

Jacksonville Jaguars (second stint)
On March 14, 2018, Carey signed with the Jacksonville Jaguars. He was placed on injured reserve on August 21, 2018 due to a hamstring injury. He was released on August 28, 2018.

Detroit Lions (second stint)
On November 20, 2018, Carey was signed by the Detroit Lions, only to be released three days later.

Political career
Carey ran for and won a seat on the Chesapeake, Virginia city council in 2020. Though the race was non-partisan and Carey was listed as an independent, he had the backing of the Republican Party. Carey placed first in a field of seven candidates and was sworn into office on July 1.

Electoral history

References

External links

City Council profile
Detroit Lions bio 
Norfolk State Spartans bio

1987 births
Living people
Players of American football from Grand Rapids, Michigan
Players of American football from Norfolk, Virginia
American football cornerbacks
Norfolk State Spartans football players
Cleveland Browns players
Jacksonville Jaguars players
Detroit Lions players
Politicians from Chesapeake, Virginia